Saeed Murtaza (born 1939) was an Indian politician. He was a member of 6th Lok Sabha from Muzaffarnagar constituency in Uttar Pradesh. Saeed Murtaza died on 30 September 1996 by natural causes.

Positions held
 Vice-Chairman - District Board, Muzaffarnagar 
 Chairman - Town  Area, Purqazi 
 Member - Uttar Pradesh Legislative Assembly 1969-74
 Member - 6th Lok  Sabha, 1977–79 
 Deputy Minister of Irrigation, Uttar Pradesh

References

1939 births
Living people
India MPs 1977–1979
Lok Sabha members from Uttar Pradesh
Bharatiya Lok Dal politicians
People from Muzaffarnagar
Uttar Pradesh MLAs 1969–1974
Janata Party politicians